Pelion Mountain is a  summit located in the Tantalus Range, in Tantalus Provincial Park, in southwestern British Columbia, Canada. Unnamed glaciers surround the peak and precipitation runoff from the peak drains into tributaries of the Squamish River and Clowhom River. The first ascent of the mountain was made in 1944 by V. Brink and B. McLellan. The mountain names in the Tantalus Range have a Greek mythology theme, and Pelion Mountain was named for the legendary Pelion mountain in Thessaly, upon which the Aloadaes are said to have attempted to pile Mount Pelion on top of Mount Ossa in their attempt to scale Olympus, home of the Greek gods. The mountain's name was officially adopted on June 6, 1957, by the Geographical Names Board of Canada.

Climate

Based on the Köppen climate classification, Pelion Mountain is located in the marine west coast climate zone of western North America. Most weather fronts originate in the Pacific Ocean, and travel east toward the Coast Mountains where they are forced upward by the range (Orographic lift), causing them to drop their moisture in the form of rain or snowfall. As a result, the Coast Mountains experience high precipitation, especially during the winter months in the form of snowfall. Temperatures can drop below −20 °C with wind chill factors below −30 °C. July through September offer the best months to catch favorable weather for climbing Pelion.

Climbing Routes
Established climbing routes on Pelion Mountain:

 Southwest Ridge -  First Ascent 1944 
 Northwest Ridge -  FA 1968
 Northeast Ridge -  FA 1969
 North Face - 

Approaches may be made via Sigurd Creek Trail or Pokosha Creek.

See also

 Geography of British Columbia
 Geology of British Columbia

References

External links
 Weather: Pelion Mountain

Two-thousanders of British Columbia
Pacific Ranges
Sea-to-Sky Corridor
New Westminster Land District